Maria Gaspari (born 9 December 1991 in Pieve di Cadore) is an Italian curler.

Gaspari Is currently the alternate player for Team Federica Apollonio

She plays in lead position as a lead and is right-handed.

References

2016 Worlds Media guide
http://www.worldcurling.org/wwcc2016/teams

External links
 

1991 births
Living people
Italian female curlers
Sportspeople from the Province of Belluno